James Harrison (died 22 March 1602) was an English Roman Catholic priest. He is a Catholic martyr.

Life
Born in the Diocese of Lichfield, he studied at the English College at Reims, and was ordained there in September 1583. In the following year he went on the English mission, where he worked unobtrusively.

In the early part of 1602 he was ministering to Catholics in Yorkshire and was resident in the house of a gentleman of the name of Anthony Battie (or Bates). While there, he was arrested by the pursuivants, together with Battie was tried at York and sentenced to death for high treason. The charge against Harrison was that he performed the functions of a Catholic priest, and that against Battie was that he had entertained Harrison.

The judge left York without fixing the date of execution, but Harrison was informed on the evening of 21 March that he was to die the next morning. With Battie, he was hanged, drawn, and quartered. The English Franciscans at Douai had his head as a relic for many years.

See also

References

Attribution
 The entry cites:
Joseph Gillow, Bibl. Dict. Eny. Cath., s. v.; 
Richard Challoner, Memoirs, I; 
Douay Diaries; 
Dodd-Tierney, Church History, II.

1602 deaths
16th-century English Roman Catholic priests
People executed under Elizabeth I by hanging, drawing and quartering
Year of birth unknown
Executed English people
Venerable martyrs of England and Wales